The MV Agusta F3 is a series of motorcycles introduced in 2012 by the Italian manufacturer MV Agusta. These models are the first three-cylinder machines that MV Agusta have manufactured since the famous three-cylinder GP racers of the 1970s.

Overview
The bike was designed by Adrian Morton and the engine designed by Ezio Mascheroni. It was first shown at the EICMA motorcycle show in Milan on 2 November 2010, and incorporates the lines of the MV Agusta F4, with the diamond headlamp, tapered seat shell and single-sided swinging arm offering a view of the rear rim. Unlike the F4, the exhausts are not positioned under the seat but open on the right side of the bike, just in front of the rear wheel.

The limited edition Oro (Gold) version went on sale in December 2011 and the standard model in January 2012. Since 2013, the F3 has been offered with two different engine sizes: 675 and 800 cc.

The F3 was developed in conjunction with the Brutale 3 cylinder, ushering in a new chassis and new engine, giving the brand a new lease of life on the commercial front. The engine of the F3 serves as the basis for the entire 3-cylinder range of the manufacturer: the Rivale, Stradale and Turismo Veloce "hypermotard" models.

Technology
The 675 cc engine uses a three-cylinder layout, which has given many world titles to the Varese company, but has been enriched by modern technology, such as multi-map wire guidance, to optimise engine performance based on needs and rider's preferences and controlled through simple settings.

A counter-rotating (reverse) crankshaft is used, which had previously only been used on MotoGP motorcycles, such as the Yamaha YZR-M1, which counteracts the centripetal forces of the wheels allowing the bike to turn faster. The bore and stroke are 79 mm and 45.9 mm, which is an extremely short-stroke. In conjunction with titanium valves, this allows an extremely high speed engine speed. The engine develops 126 bhp at 14,400 rpm. Motor control is handled by the MV Agusta MVICS system, which includes ride-by-wire motor control. This includes four pre-set and one individually adjustable rider's setting (similar to the BMW system) as well as an adjustable traction control with eight levels,

The MV Agusta's usual short wheelbase, steep steering head angle (66°) and resulting short trail (99 mm), gives the machine gives very good handling combined with high stability. The steel tubular lattice frame with aluminum swinging arm support is relatively short and the single-sided swinging arm relatively long. The 43 mm Marzocchi upside-down forks are, like the rear Sachs shock absorber, are fully adjustable, as usual in this class. The cassette gearbox can be fitted with an automatic switchgear (MV Agusta EAS) for a surcharge.

Braking is provided by Brembo, with two 320 mm diameter discs at the front, with radial-mounted four-piston calipers, and a 220 mm diameter disc and a double-piston caliper at the rear. The wheels are made of aluminium.

An 800 cc version was introduced in 2013. To obtain the extra displacement the stroke was increased from 45.9 mm to 54.3 mm. The 800 develops 148 bhp at 13,000 rpm.

In 2021 the 800cc was revised to meet the Euro 5 emission standard. Friction within the engine was reduced which, along with other changes, allowed the engine to still produce . The Rosso was the first model to use the engine, followed soon after by the F3 RR.

Color variants
Every year, several colour variants of the F3 are offered, mostly the classic red/silver with a black frame, white with red frame and grey/black with red frame.

675 cc Models

F3 675
The "baseline" model of the series, introduced in 2012

F3 Serie Oro
A limited edition of 200 machines were produced to mark the launch of the new model series. The model has gold finished rear frame plates, swinging arms and wheels.  Öhlins suspension, racing-spec Brembo brakes and carbon-fibre bodywork are fitted. The model comes with a certificate of authenticity and a gold badge on the top yoke engraved with the production number.

F3 675 RC
Introduced in 2018, the F3 675 RC (Reparto Corse) is a model inspired by the MV racers. It features an uprated engine (133 bhp) and chassis. A race-spec titanium exhaust system is fitted. Production is limited to 350 machines.

800 cc Models

F3 800
Introduced in 2013, the F3 800 features the larger 800 cc engine, developing 148 bhp.

F3 800 AGO
In 2014 a special version, the F3 800 AGO was introduced. It was dedicated to the former MV multiple world champion Giacomo Agostini. Production was limited to 300 units. It was equipped with lightweight components made of magnesium and carbon, bringing the weight down to 171 kg. The electronic management of the bike was integrated with the MVICS system (Motor & Vehicle Integrated Control System). The bikes were finished in red, white and green (Italian tricolor colours) and autographed by Agostini.

F3 800 RC
Like the smaller 675 RC, this 2018 350 units limited edition receives an updated engine, chassis and bodywork from the MV race shop. Power is increased to 153 bhp.

F3 XX
The track only F3 XX was announced in May 2019 by Reparto Corse. Extensive use is made of carbon fibre. Amongst the electronics suite is data logging to analyse lap times.

F3 Rosso
The F3 Rosso was introduced in 2021 as the new entry-level model using the Euro 5 compliant engine. It also had a revised frame that was stiffer than previous models and had revised steering geometry. Like other MV Rosso models, the machine was finished in red.

F3 RR
Introduced in 2021, the F3 RR is the first high performance model using the Euro 5 engine. The aerodynamics were revised, including front winglets (called appendages by MV) that generate  downforce to the front wheel, while other improvements to the airflow around the bike negated the drag caused by the winglets.

Racing
Two MV Agusta F3 675 competed in the 2013 Supersport World Championship season with bikes managed by Team ParkinGO; Roberto Rolfo and Christian Iddon rode the bikes achieving three podiums.

In 2014 MV Agusta made any official return to racing. Giovanni Castiglioni, chairman and President of MV Agusta, signed an agreement with Alexander Yakhnich, Chairman of Yakhnich Motorsport, to establish the new MV Agusta Reparto Corse for the 2014 season. The team was operated by Yakhnich Motorsport and competed in the Supersport and Superbike World Championships. In June 2014 Castiglioni and Yakhnich signed an agreement giving MV Agusta control over all operations concerning the racing team. Rider Jules Cluzel scored 3 wins for the team and finished 2nd in the championship this season. The ATK Racing Team also entered an F3 in 3 races of the 2014 Supersport World Championship, ridden by Alex Baldolini

Jules Cluzel and  Lorenzo Zanetti rode for Reparto Corse in 2015, Cluzel winning 3 races. Alex Baldolini also rode an F3 entered by Race Department ATK#25. In Jerez, two other F3s were entered; Nicola Jr. Morrentino (Team Factory Vamag) and Miroslav Popov (GRT Racing Team).

In 2016, Cluzel and Zanetti were retained by Reparto Corse, Cluzel winning 2 races. Gino Rea and Aiden Wagner rode for the GRT Racing Team, Baldolini again rode for Race Department ATK#25 and Roberto Rolfo for Team Factory Vamag. Schmidt Racing entered Kyle Ryde and Nicolás Terol on MVs, but changed to Kawasaki Ninja ZX-6R machines part way through the season. Ilario Dionisi rode an F3 for Ellan Vannin Motorsport in Misano.

P. J. Jacobsen and Alessandro Zaccone rode for Reparto Corse in 2017. Davide Pizzoli joined Baldolini at Race Department ATK#25, but the team changed from F3s to the Yamaha YZF-R6 for the last races of the season. Rolfo remained at Team Factory Vamag but was replaced by Lorenzo Zanetti from Germany onwards.

MV Agusta Reparto Corse partnered with Team Vamag in late 2017 in preparation for the 2018 Supersport World Championship. The team was known as MV Agusta Reparto Corse by Vamag that season. Raffaele De Rosa and Ayrton Badovini were the two riders for the team. Davide Stirpe rode an F3 in two rounds for Extreme Racing Bardahl.

In 2019 Raffaele De Rosa was retained by Reparto Corse and joined by Federico Fuligni.

Supersport World Championship Results

Bold – Pole positionItalics – Fastest lap* Season in progress.

References

F3 series
Sport bikes
Motorcycles introduced in 2012